() is a Chinese rover on Mars, the country's first to land on another planet after it previously landed two rovers on the Moon. The rover is part of the Tianwen-1 mission to Mars conducted by the China National Space Administration (CNSA).

The spacecraft was launched on 23 July 2020 and inserted into Martian orbit on 10 February 2021. The lander, carrying the rover, performed a successful soft-landing on Mars on 14 May 2021, making China the third country to successfully soft-land a spacecraft on Mars and the second one to establish stable communications from the surface, after the United States. Zhurong was successfully deployed on 22 May 2021, 02:40 UTC.

Designed for a lifespan of 90 sols (93 Earth days), Zhurong has been active for 347 sols (356.5 days) since its deployment on Mars's surface. The rover has been inactive since 20 May 2022 due to the approaching sandstorms and Martian winter, pending its self-awakening at an appropriate temperature and sunlight condition.

Name 
Zhurong is named after a Chinese mytho-historical figure usually associated with fire and light, as Mars is called "the Planet of Fire" in China and some other countries in East Asia. It was selected by a public online vote held between 20 January 2021 and 28 February 2021, with Zhurong ranking first with 504,466 votes. The name was chosen with the meanings of "igniting the fire of interstellar exploration in China" and "to symbolize the Chinese people's determination to explore the stars and to uncover unknowns in the universe".

History
China began its first interplanetary exploration attempt in 2011 by sending Yinghuo-1, a Mars orbiter, in a joint mission with Russia. It did not leave Earth orbit due to a failure of the Russian launch vehicle. As a result, CNSA then embarked on its independent Mars mission.

The first early model of the future Mars rover was on display in November 2014 at the 10th China International Aviation & Aerospace Exhibition. It had an appearance similar to the Yutu lunar rover, which had deployed on the Moon.

On 22 April 2016, Xu Dazhe, head of the CNSA, announced that the Mars mission had been approved on 11 January 2016. A probe would be sent to Martian orbit and attempt to land on Mars in 2020.

On 23 August 2016, CNSA revealed the first images of the final version of the Mars mission spacecraft, which confirmed the composition of a Mars orbiter, lander, and rover in one mission.

The scientific objectives and payloads of the Mars mission were declared in a paper published in Journal of Deep Space Exploration in December 2017.

On 24 April 2020, China's interplanetary exploration program was formally announced by CNSA, along with the name Tianwen and an emblem of the program. The first mission of the program, the Mars mission to be carried out in 2020, was named Tianwen-1.

On 24 April 2021, in anticipation of the upcoming landing attempt, CNSA formally announced that the rover would be named Zhurong.

Test Rover
To design and test the rover and simulate conditions at Utopia Planitia, CNSA kept a test bed rover in a Mars yard at the China Academy of Space Technology in Beijing. The Field Test Rover (FTR) was made two years before the actual Zhurong was built, and some of the FTR components were used in the vehicle flown to Mars. The FTR completed thousands of tests on the ground before the start of the mission. The twin remained in service to help scientists and engineers determine the path for Zhurong by testing maneuvers in the Mars yard.

Landing area selection

The landing area was determined based on two criteria:
 Engineering feasibility, including latitude, altitude, slope, surface condition, rock distribution, local wind speed, visibility requirements during the EDL process.
 Scientific objectives, including geology, soil structure and water ice distribution, surface elements, mineral, and rock distribution, magnetic field detection.

Two areas were preselected in the next stage: Chryse Planitia and Utopia Planitia.

The candidate in Utopia Planitia was favored by the team due to higher chances of finding evidence for whether an ancient ocean existed on the northern part of Mars. It was eventually selected as the final landing area of the mission.

Mission timeline
Tianwen-1, along with Zhurong rover, was launched at 12:41 UTC+8 on 23 July 2020, from the Wenchang Spacecraft Launch Site by a Long March 5 heavy-lift rocket.

After a 202-day journey through interplanetary space, Tianwen-1 inserted itself into Martian orbit on 10 February 2021, thereby becoming China's first Mars orbiter. Subsequently, it performed several orbital maneuvers and began surveying target landing sites on Mars in preparation for the coming landing attempt.

On 14 May 2021, the lander and Zhurong rover separated from Tianwen-1's orbiter. After experiencing Mars atmospheric entry that lasted about nine minutes, the lander and rover made a successful soft landing in the Utopia Planitia, using a combination of aeroshell, parachute, and retrorocket. With the landing, China became the second country to operate a fully functional spacecraft on Martian surface, after the United States.

After establishing stable communication with the rover, CNSA released its first pictures from the surface of Mars on 19 May 2021.

On 22 May 2021, at 10:10 a.m. Beijing time (0240 GMT), Zhurong drove from its landing platform to the surface of Mars, starting its exploration mission.

On 11 June 2021, CNSA released the first batch of scientific images from the surface of Mars including a panoramic image taken by Zhurong, and a colored group photo of Zhurong and the Tianwen-1 lander taken by a wireless camera placed on Martian soil. The panoramic image is composed of 24 single shots taken by the NaTeCam before the rover was deployed to the Martian surface. The image reveals that the topography and rock abundance near the landing site was consistent with previous anticipations from the scientist on typical south Utopia Planitia features with small but widespread rocks, white wave patterns, and mud volcanoes.

On 27 June 2021, CNSA released images and videos of Zhurong EDL process and movement on Martian surface, including a clip of sounds made by Zhurong recorded by its instrument, Mars Climatic Station (MCS).

On 12 July 2021, Zhurong visited the parachute and backshell dropped onto Martian surface during its landing on 14 May.

As of 15 August 2021, Zhurong had officially completed its planned exploration tasks and will continue to drive towards the southern part of Utopia Planitia where it landed. On 18 August 2021, Zhurong outlived its lifespan. The Chinese scientists and engineers announced an extended expedition aiming to investigate an ancient coastal area on Mars.

After 20 October 2021, the rover continued, having paused and stopped in a sleeping mode around the time of the Mars conjunction of October 8. The pause was necessary due to the strong solar radiation in the line of sight with Earth, creating too high levels of "noise" for secure radio communication to function (Radio blackout) with the Chinese relay satellite orbiting Mars. The rover continued its travel in the southern direction.

By September 2022, Zhurong had returned a total of 1,480 gigabytes of raw data, offering evidence to support the hypothesis of a once existed ancient ocean in the Utopia Planitia.

On 27 February 2023, Chinese scientists published the Mars weather report, including surface pressure and wind changes on Mars, based on the data collected by Zhurong in its first 325 sols.

In May 2022, the Zhurong was switched to hibernation mode to protect against the coming Martian winter and a major sandstorm coming to its location, with an expected awakening date on 26 December 2022. In January 2023, South China Morning Post reported that the CNSA scientists didn't receive the signal from the rover. CNSA plans to dispatch the Tianwen-1 orbiter for investigation. The rover stayed in Utopia Planetia in Mars northern hemisphere, where the temperature was extremely low at -100°C (-148°F). According to the authorities, the rover is programmed to restart when its power level reaches 140 watts with key components warmed to 15°C (5°F).

It was speculated that the duststorm reduced solar radiation on the Martian surface and covered the solar panels, leading to insufficient energy to restart the solar-powered Zhurong. The rover was observed covered in sand and dust, hindering its ability to gather sunlight and recharge. The rover is equipped with flippable butterfly-like solar panels to remove accumulated dust and debris, but the cleaning function requires the rover to return operational first. The rover does not carry a radioisotope heater unit, and heating is instead provided by the chemical compound n-undecane to store energy. The rover could possibly restart if whirlwinds can clean the dust off the solar panels and the radiation level continues to rise in the coming Martian summer. On 21 February 2023, Mars Reconnaissance Orbiter confirmed the rover didn't change its position after the hibernation, between September 2022 and February 2023, and data from NASA's Perseverance rover indicated the Martian surface is still relatively cold in February, potentially below Zhurongs awakening requirement.

Cooperation with European Space Agency 
In November 2021, the CNSA and European Space Agency (ESA) conducted tests to learn if an ESA orbiter, Mars Express, could serve as a relay for data sent from Zhurong. Several steps were involved. ESA commanded Mars Express to point toward Zhurong while passing overhead, so it could receive a signal from the rover. CNSA commanded its Tianwen-1 orbiter to tell Zhurong to send the data. Mars Express received the data from Zhurong and transmitted it to Earth. The deep space stations of ESA received the data and sent it to CNSA. The data were then compared with the original Chinese signal. Five tests were performed, but four of them failed. A test on November 20 succeeded. The analysis found that another device aboard Mars Express caused the failures by disturbing transmission. Tianwen-1's ability to act as a relay for Zhurong has lessened because it is spending more time on its main mission of mapping Mars. As a result, CNSA and ESA agreed to the tests to determine if Mars Express could be a relay for the rover.

Exploration

Objectives
The rover's mission planned tasks are to:
 Study the topography and geology of the local area
 Examine the soil, and any ice content
 Survey the elements, minerals and rocks
 Atmospheric sampling

Instruments

It is powered by four solar panels along with n-undecane stored in 10 containers under two circular windows on the deck absorbs heat and melts during the daytime and solidifies and releases heat at night. It carries six scientific instruments:

NASA's Perseverance rover, launched and landed in the same year, is also equipped with the ground-penetrating radar.
 Mars Rover Magnetometer (RoMAG) obtains the fine-scale structures of crustal magnetic field based on mobile measurements on the Martian surface.
 Mars Climate Station (MCS) (also MMMI Mars Meteorological Measurement Instrument) measures the temperature, pressure, wind velocity and direction of the surface atmosphere, and has a microphone to capture Martian sounds. During the rover's deployment, it recorded the sound, acting as the second Martian sound instrument to record Martian sounds successfully after Mars 2020 Perseverance rover's microphones.
 Mars Surface Compound Detector (MarSCoDe) combines laser-induced breakdown spectroscopy (LIBS) and infrared spectroscopy.
 Multispectral Camera (MSCam) Combined with MarSCoDe, MSCam investigates the mineral components to establish the relationship between Martian surface water environment and secondary mineral types, and to search for historical environmental conditions for the presence of liquid water.
 Navigation and Topography Cameras (NaTeCam) With 2048 × 2048 resolution, NaTeCam is used to construct topography maps, extract parameters such as slope, undulation and roughness, investigate geological structures, and conduct comprehensive analysis on the geological structure of the surface parameters.

Among the six scientific instruments, RoPeR works during roving; MarSCoDe, MSCam and NaTeCam work when being stationary; RoMAG and MCS work both when moving or still.

Other instruments include:
 Remote Camera A small camera dropped by the rover to take photos of the rover and the lander on 1 June 2021. Captured images are transferred to the rover via Wi-Fi.

Plan
The rover had a planned operational lifetime of 90 sols. Originally, every three sols were defined as one operation period. The basic process of each operation period was:

 Sol 1: NaTeCam captures images on Martian surface for analysis and operations planning.
 Sol 2: Each payload performs scientific exploration.
 Sol 3: The rover moves towards target location. RoMAG and MCS collect data when roving.

Acquired data is downlinked each sol. The data will be processed by teams in CNSA during an official 5–6 months' proprietary period before being released to the scientific community.

In July 2021, the designer of Tianwen-1 orbiter disclosed that due to Zhurong better-than-expected performance, the original three-day period has been merged into one, accelerating its exploration process.

Gallery

See also

 Planetary Exploration of China
 List of rovers on extraterrestrial bodies
 Exploration of Mars
 Viking 1 (lander)
 Viking 2 (lander)
 Sojourner (rover)
 Spirit (rover)
 Opportunity (rover)
 Curiosity (rover)
 Perseverance (rover)
 Rosalind Franklin (rover) (planned mission)

References 

2020 in China
2021 on Mars
Articles containing video clips
Astrobiology space missions
Chinese space probes
July 2020 events in Asia
Mars rovers
Missions to Mars
Six-wheeled robots
Space probes launched in 2020
Mars robots